Diana Çuli (born 13 April 1951, Tirana) is an Albanian writer, journalist and politician. She graduated from the Faculty of Philosophy of the University of Tirana in 1973. After graduation she joined the editorial boards of Drita and French-speaking magazine Les lettres albanaises. In 1990, she became involved with the democratic opposition and became the head of the Independent Women's Forum, and then joined the Albanian Social Democratic Party.

Since 2006, she has been a representative of Albania in the Parliamentary Assembly of the Council of Europe. In Albania, she works for women's rights, particularly those forced into prostitution. As of 2004 she was the chair of the Albania Women's Federation.

At the end of the 1970s, she published her first short story Ndërgjegja (Conscience). She has published eight novels, and is the author of screenplays for films such as Hije që mbeten pas (1985), Rrethi i kujtesës (1987),
and Bregu i ashpër (1988).

Selected works
 1980: Jehonat e jetës
 1983: Zëri i largët
 1986: Dreri i trotuareve
 1992: Rekuiem
 1993: ... dhe nata u nda në mes
 2000: Diell në mesnatë
 2006: Engjëj të armatosur
 2009: Gruaja na kafe
 2011: Hoteli i drunjtë

See also
 Rreze Abdullahu
 Mimoza Ahmeti
 Flora Brovina
 Klara Buda
 Elvira Dones
 Musine Kokalari
 Helena Kadare
 Irma Kurti

References

1951 births
Living people
Albanian journalists
Albanian women journalists
Albanian human rights activists
People from Tirana
Albanian women short story writers
Albanian short story writers
Albanian women novelists
Albanian novelists
Women screenwriters
University of Tirana alumni
21st-century Albanian women politicians
21st-century Albanian politicians
Albanian atheists
20th-century short story writers
20th-century Albanian women writers
21st-century Albanian women writers
20th-century Albanian writers
21st-century Albanian writers